Matthias Buxhofer (born 30 September 1973) is an Austrian former professional road racing cyclist. Professional from 2000 to 2005, he rode in the 2002 Giro d'Italia, finishing 55th overall. He also competed in the road race at the 2000 Summer Olympics, and finished in 51st place.

Major results

1993
 3rd National Cyclo-cross Championships
1994
 1st Prologue Tour of Austria
 1st Burgenland Rundfahrt
 3rd National Cyclo-cross Championships
1995
 1st Stage 4 Tour of Austria
 2nd National Cyclo-cross Championships
 3rd Straßenengler Radsporttag
1996
 2nd National Cyclo-cross Championships
1997
 3rd National Cyclo-cross Championships
 3rd Overall Uniqa Classic
1998
 1st  Overall Istrian Spring Trophy
 3rd Overall Uniqa Classic
1999
 2nd National Hill-climb Championships
2000
 1st Wartenberg-Rundfahrt
 1st Vorarlberg GP
 7th Overall Tour of Germany
2001
 1st Stage 5 Tour of Germany
 3rd Overall Niedersachsen Rundfahrt
2002
 2nd Schynberg Rundfahrt
 3rd National Time Trial Championships

References

1973 births
Living people
Austrian male cyclists
People from Feldkirch, Vorarlberg
Olympic cyclists of Austria
Cyclists at the 2000 Summer Olympics
Sportspeople from Vorarlberg